Calhoun County High School is a public secondary school in St. Matthews, South Carolina, United States.

Campus
The campus has a pasture with the new K–8 school in front of it on Saints Avenue.

Extracurricular activities
The school's sports teams, known as the Saints, compete in the South Carolina High School League Class AA, Region V. They field teams in baseball, basketball, football, softball, track, and volleyball.

State championship titles held by the school's teams include:
Boys' basketball: 1996 (AA), 2000 (AA), 2001 (AA), 2004 (AA), 2006 (A), 2007 (A), 2008 (A), 2009 (A)

The boys' basketball team holds the state record for consecutive wins, at 78.

Notable alumni
 Mike Colter – actor 
 Alshon Jeffery – Philadelphia Eagles wide receiver
 Phillip Merling – former American football defensive end
Chris Rumph – former head coach for the high school and has spent over 20 years coaching collegiately and in the National Football League (NFL)

References

Public high schools in South Carolina
Schools in Calhoun County, South Carolina